Ricardo Rafael Sandoval (born 5 February 1999) is an American professional boxer. As of December 2021, he is ranked as the world's fifth best flyweight by The Ring and sixth best by TBRB.

Professional boxing career
Sandoval made his professional debut against Adalberto Solares on 18 June 2016, and won the fight by a third-round technical knockout. He amassed a 16–0 record during the next three years, with eleven of those fights coming by way of stoppage. Following his step-up fight against Marco Sustaita, Sandoval was scheduled to face Gilbert Gonzalez on 16 November 2019. He won the fight by a fifth-round technical knockout.

Sandoval's sole fight of 2020 came against Raymond Tabugon on 6 February 2020. He won the fight by a seventh-round knockout, stopping Tabugon at the 1:43 minute mark of the round.

Sandoval was scheduled to face one-time WBC flyweight title challenger Jay Harris in an IBF flyweight title eliminator, in the main event of a DAZN card, on 25 June 2021. Despite coming into the fight as a slight underdog, Sandoval nonetheless won the fight by an eight-round knockout. The fight was stopped at the 2:21 minute mark of the round, after Harris was dropped to the canvas twice and was unable to beat the eight count following the second knockdown. Sandoval was scheduled to fight Carlos Buitrago in a stay-busy fight on 4 December 2021. He won the fight by a seventh-round technical knockout.

Sandoval faced David Jiménez in a WBA flyweight title eliminator on 16 July 2022, on the undercard of the Ryan Garcia and Javier Fortuna lightweight bout. Sandoval was knocked down in the eleventh round, which proved to be the pivotal moment of the bout, as he lost the fight by majority decision: Two judges scored the fight 114–112 for Jiménez, while the third judge scored it 113–113. Most ringside observers thought Sandoval won the fight, as well as the odds-makers, who had Sandoval as a +900 favorite to win by the end of the contest.

Sandoval faced Jerson Ortiz on 18 February 2023. He won the fight by a second-round knockout. Sandoval dropped his opponent with a punch to the body in the dying seconds of the round, which left Ortiz unable to rise from the canvas.

Professional boxing record

References

Living people
1999 births
American male boxers
Boxers from California
Flyweight boxers